Vaccine Maitri ("Vaccine Friendship") is a humanitarian initiative undertaken by the Indian government to provide COVID-19 vaccines to countries around the world. The government started providing vaccines from 20 January 2021. As of 21February 2022, India had delivered around 16.29 crore (162.9 million) doses of vaccines to 96 countries. Of these, 1.43 cror (14.3 million) doses were gifted to 98 countries by the Government of India. The remaining 10.71 cror were supplied by the vaccine producers under its commercial and 4.15 cror were supplied by COVAX obligations. In late March 2021, the Government of India temporarily froze exports of the Covishield, citing India's own COVID crisis and the domestic need for these vaccines.
The Health Minister of India,  Mansukh Mandaviya announced in September that India will resume the export of vaccines from October to the rest of the world.

200,000 doses of COVID-19 vaccines were gifted by India to the UN peacekeepers on 27 March to be distributed to all peacekeeping missions.

Vaccines

India has two approved COVID-19 vaccines: Covishield and Covaxin. Both of them were exported and used in foreign grants by the Government of India.

Covishield
On 1 January 2021, the Drug Controller General of India, approved the emergency or conditional use of Covishield. Covishield is developed by the University of Oxford and its spin-out company, Vaccitech.

Covaxin
On 2 January 2021, Covaxin India's first COVID-19 vaccine, developed by Bharat Biotech in association with the Indian Council of Medical Research and National Institute of Virology received approval from the Drug Controller General of India for its emergency or conditional usage.

Vaccine supply
India kicked off international shipment of the vaccines on 20 January 2021, only four days after starting its own vaccination program. Bhutan and Maldives were the first countries to receive vaccines as a grant by India. This was quickly followed by shipments to Nepal, Bangladesh, Myanmar and Seychelles. By mid-March 2021, India was also supplying vaccines on a commercial basis to countries including Canada, the UK, and Saudi Arabia.

The Serum Institute of India was selected as a key supplier of cost-effective COVID-19 vaccines to the COVAX initiative, 19.8 million doses of Covishield vaccines were supplied by India to various countries through the initiative.

In May, when COVAX was already short 140 million doses, the Serum Institute announced that it expected to maintain its suspension of vaccine deliveries to COVAX through the end of 2021 due to the second wave of COVID-19 in India and the US ban on export of key raw materials.

As of 21 February, 2022, India had exported total 16,29,63,500 doses including 1,42,67,000 vaccine provided as grant, 10,71,48,000 as commercial, and 4,15,48,500 through COVAX to 96 nations.

International reaction

International organizations
 IMF: IMF chief economist Gita Gopinath lauded India for playing a key role during the crisis by dispatching vaccines to many countries. She said "I also want to mention that India really stands out in terms of its vaccine policy. If you look at where exactly is one manufacturing hub for vaccines in the worldthat will be India."

Countries
  of the OACPS has thanked Indian efforts in delivering vaccines to developing and least developed countries.
   Prime minister Khadga Prasad Oli thanked India stating; “We got an early chance to administer the Covid-19 vaccine. For this, I thank our neighbouring nation India, its government, the people, and especially Prime Minister Narendra Modi. They sent 10 lakh doses of vaccines to us as a grant within a week of the roll-out in India.”
  on behalf of CARICOM thanked India for providing vaccine supplies to them.
  Prime Minister Mia Amor Mottley thanked Prime Minister Narendra Modi for the supply of "Made in India" COVID-19 vaccines. She tweeted, "PM Modi made it possible for more than 40,000 persons in Barbados and tens of thousands elsewhere, to receive their 1st dose of COVISHIELD via Vaccine Maitri before receiving his. A genuine demonstration of generosity. Thank you and we wish you continued good health."
  Prime Minister Gaston Browne had thanked Prime Minister of India Narendra Modi "for demonstrating an act of benevolence, kindness and empathy", for sending vaccines to Caribbean countries.
  Afghanistan's ambassador to India Farid Mamundzay said "Thank you, India for providing Afghan people lifesaving gift on the first day of 2022!"

Leaders who received vaccines provided by India
  – Heng Samrin, Say Chhum
  – KP Sharma Oli

Gallery

See also
 Vaccine diplomacy
 COVID-19 vaccination in India

References

COVID-19 vaccines
Foreign relations of India
Foreign policy of the Narendra Modi administration
COVID-19 pandemic in India